E3 ubiquitin-protein ligase synoviolin is an enzyme that in humans is encoded by the SYVN1 gene.

Function 

This gene encodes a protein involved in endoplasmic reticulum (ER)-associated degradation. The encoded protein removes unfolded proteins, accumulated during ER stress, by retrograde transport to the cytosol from the ER. This protein also uses the ubiquitin-proteasome system for additional degradation of unfolded proteins. This gene and the mitochondrial ribosomal protein L49 gene use in their respective 3' UTRs some of the same genomic sequence. Sequence analysis identified two transcript variants that encode different isoforms.

References

Further reading

External links